In 1755, during the French and Indian War, marauding Indians allied with the French attacked European settlers along the Blue Mountains of Pennsylvania. Several of these attacks occurred near the Swatara Gap area. Peter Hedrick and other Swatara Gap area settlers fortified Hedrick's farmstead by building a log-walled stockade around the structure. This was the beginning of Fort Swatara.
On January 25, 1756, Captain Frederick Smith and a company of 50 militiamen received orders from Robert Hunter Morris, deputy governor of Colonial Pennsylvania, to take posts at Swatara Gap. Capt. Smith's orders were to occupy the existing fortification at Hedrick's farmstead and reinforce it if necessary. Smith's troops erected a military-style log blockhouse and magazine shed for ammunition storage and surrounded the structures with a sturdy log stockade.

Skirmishes near Fort Swatara
Early in the French and Indian War several skirmishes occurred near Fort Swatara between Native American Indians and Colonial Pennsylvania militiamen.

In the summer of 1756, two settlers were killed by marauding Native American Indians near Fort Swatara. The Colonial Pennsylvania militia forces deployed eight troops to protect settlers working in nearby farm fields, eight to patrol western areas near the fort, sixteen to guard settlers that were living in close proximity to the fort, and twenty-one were sent to nearby Fort Manada.

In August 1756, one settler and two Colonial Pennsylvania militia troops were killed near Fort Swatara. Three child kidnappings within two miles of the fort also occurred. Native American Indians also killed several settlers that were relocating from the Fort Swatara area.

In August 1757, five local settlers (including two brothers) were killed by Native American Indians, and a Colonial Pennsylvania militia soldier was wounded. A mother and child were also kidnapped.
  
In April 1758, A group of marauding Native American Indians staged another attack near Fort Swatara and four more settlers were killed and a woman was kidnapped.

Fort Swatara abandoned
By mid-1758, British forces started gaining control of the French and Indian War and Indian attacks in the Blue Mountains of Pennsylvania were subsiding. The Colonial Pennsylvania government ordered the troops stationed at Fort Swatara to join British military units as they were advancing on French outposts. Fort Swatara was officially abandoned and it was never used again for military purposes.

Fort Swatara’s site recognized
Today, no remnants of Fort Swatara exist, but its site is marked with two boulders and a Pennsylvania Historical Marker.

Fort Swatara’s boulder markers
In July 1932, the Lebanon County Historical Society dedicated two boulders with copper plates to designate the location of Fort Swatara. The smaller boulder is located in a field near where the fort actually stood. The larger boulder was placed along the roadside near where the fort once stood. The epitaph on the larger boulder's plate reads: “Fort Swatara of the French and Indian War. Erected in the fall of 1755. It stood 500 feet south of this spot, directly north of the run of water flowing east and west. Commanded by Capt. Frederick Smith, of Chester County, of the First Battalion of the Pennsylvania Provincial Regiment, Lieut. Colonel Conrad Weiser commanding. Finally abandoned in 1758, Capt.-Lieut. Samuel Allen in command. It consisted of a block house pierced for musketry fire and surrounded by a stockade. This boulder tablet placed by the Lebanon County Historical Society. Capt. H.M.M. Richards, President.”

Pennsylvania historical marker
On July 14, 1999, a roadside Pennsylvania historical marker for Fort Swatara was dedicated and placed about one mile north of Lickdale along Pennsylvania Route 72. It reads: “Fort Swatara – Originally built by Peter Hedrick, 1755. The stockaded blockhouse was improved in early 1756 by Capt. Frederick Smith to guard Swatara Gap and protect the frontier settlements. Site is on Fort Swatara Drive about a half a mile from this intersection.”

References

External links
 French and Indian War in Pennsylvania.
 Philadelphia and the surrounding area played a significant role in the Seven Years’ War (1756-63).
 Original documentation of service by Pennsylvanians in the French and Indian War (Note: this information is very limited).

Forts in Pennsylvania
Colonial forts in Pennsylvania
French and Indian War forts
British forts in the United States
Lebanon County, Pennsylvania